Marcel Bellefeuille (21 November 1940 – 21 October 1998) was a Canadian boxer. He competed in the men's bantamweight event at the 1960 Summer Olympics. At the 1960 Summer Olympics, he lost in the Round of 32 to Horst Rascher of the United Team of Germany.

References

External links
 

1940 births
1998 deaths
Canadian male boxers
Olympic boxers of Canada
Boxers at the 1960 Summer Olympics
Boxers from Montreal
French Quebecers
Bantamweight boxers